Strophedra is a genus of moths belonging to the subfamily Olethreutinae of the family Tortricidae.

Species
Strophedra dicastica (Meyrick, 1922)
Strophedra graphologa (Diakonoff, 1976)
Strophedra homotorna (Meyrick, 1912)
Strophedra magna Komai, 1999
Strophedra mica (Diakonoff, 1976)
Strophedra nitidana (Fabricius, 1794)
Strophedra pericapna (Diakonoff, 1976)
Strophedra quercivora (Meyrick, 1920)
Strophedra weirana (Douglas, 1850)

See also
List of Tortricidae genera

References

External links
tortricidae.com

Grapholitini
Tortricidae genera
Taxa named by Gottlieb August Wilhelm Herrich-Schäffer